Osmanlı Stadium is a football stadium, based in Sincan, Turkey. The stadium holds 18,029 people, and was built in 1974 and renovated in 2008.

References

External links
 Venue information
 Basic information

Football venues in Turkey
Sports venues in Ankara
Sports venues completed in 1974
Süper Lig venues
Osmanlıspor